Ovie Prince Ejeheri (born 23 April 2003) is an English professional footballer who plays as a goalkeeper for SJK, on loan from Arsenal.

Club career
Ejeheri joined Arsenal at the age of eight. In August 2021, Ejeheri signed his first professional contract with the club. 

On 6 July 2022, Ejeheri signed for National League South club Chelmsford City on loan until January 2023. Over the course of Ejeheri's time at Chelmsford, Ejeheri made 25 appearances in all competitions, keeping 12 clean sheets. On 19 January 2023, Ejeheri signed for Finnish club SJK until the end of the season. On 28 January 2023, Ejeheri made his debut for SJK, playing the full 90 minutes in a 1–0 loss against KuPS in the Finnish League Cup.

International career
Born in Greenwich, England, Ejeheri is eligible to represent England, Nigeria or Uganda. In December 2020, Ejeheri was involved in an England youth training camp.

References

Living people
2003 births
Footballers from Greenwich
English sportspeople of Nigerian descent
English people of Ugandan descent
English footballers
Association football goalkeepers
Black British sportspeople
Arsenal F.C. players
Chelmsford City F.C. players
Seinäjoen Jalkapallokerho players